Samuel Jacob Thompson (September 2, 1845 – December 2, 1909) was a farmer, veterinarian and political figure in Manitoba. He represented Norfolk from 1886 to 1892 in the Legislative Assembly of Manitoba as a Liberal.

He was born near Caledonia, Ontario, the son of Jacob Thompson, a native of Ireland, and was educated there and at the Ontario Veterinary College. Thompson practised as a veterinary surgeon in Brantford and then came to Manitoba in 1881, settling in Carberry. In 1869, he married Margaret Farewell. Thompson operated a hotel and livery there until 1884, continuing to farm in the area. After leaving politics, he served as provincial veterinarian. He moved to St. James in 1899. Thompson served as reeve of Assiniboia.

He died in Winnipeg at the age of 64.

References 

1845 births
1909 deaths
Manitoba Liberal Party MLAs